Krakovec is a municipality and village in Rakovník District in the Central Bohemian Region of the Czech Republic. It has about 70 inhabitants.

Administrative parts
The village of Zhoř is an administrative part of Krakovec.

Sights
Krakovec is known for the ruins of the late Gothic Krakovec castle, where the Czech reformer Jan Hus allegedly stayed before departing for Konstanz in 1414. Today the castle is owned by the state and is open to the public.

References

Villages in Rakovník District